Kodalbasti is a village in the Alipurduar district of West Bengal. It is part of Chilapata Forest.

References

Villages in Alipurduar district